Hungarosaurus tormai is a herbivorous nodosaurid ankylosaur from the Upper Cretaceous (Santonian) Csehbánya Formation of the Bakony Mountains of western Hungary. It is the most completely known ankylosaur from the Cretaceous of Europe.

Discovery and naming
The species was named by Atilla Ősi in 2005. The generic name is derived from Hungary and the Greek sauros, lizard. The specific name honours András Torma, the amateur paleontologist who discovered the fossil site in 2000.

Four specimens of Hungarosaurus tormai are known, all collected from an open-pit bauxite mine near the village of Iharkút, Veszprém County, in the Bakony Mountains (Transdanubian Range) of western Hungary. The quarry exposes the Csehbánya Formation (which overlies the Halimba Formation, also Cretaceous in age), which is a floodplain and channel deposit consisting largely of sandy clays and sandstone beds. The specimen designated as the holotype is MTM Gyn/404 (in the collections of the Magyar Természettudományi Múzeum, Budapest, Hungary) and consists of 450 bones, including portions of the skull (premaxilla, left prefrontal, left lacrimal, right postorbital, jugal and quadratojugal, left frontal, pterygoid, vomer, the right quadrate and a fragment of the left quadrate, basioccipital, one hyoid), an incomplete right mandible, three cervical vertebrae, six dorsal vertebrae, ten caudal vertebrae, ossified tendon fragments, three cerival and thirteen dorsal ribs, five chevrons, the left scapulocoracoid, right scapula, portions of the right manus, a partial pelvis, and more than one hundred osteoderms.

Description
The skull of this dinosaur is estimated to have been 32–36 centimetres in length.

Phylogeny
Cladistic analysis on the taxon indicates that it is a derived member of the Nodosauridae, along with Struthiosaurus (another European nodosaurid).

Paleoecology
The exposure of the Csehbánya Formation that produced Hungarosaurus tormai has also yielded remains of bony fishes, turtles, lizards, crocodiles, and pterosaurs, along with teeth from a diminutive dromaeosaurid-like theropod and a Rhabdodon-like ornithopod.

See also 
 Timeline of ankylosaur research

References

External links 
 Hungarosaurus (with pictures) 
 Dinosaurier-Info (in German) 
 Hungarian Dinosaur Expedition (mostly in Hungarian) 

Nodosaurids
Santonian life
Late Cretaceous dinosaurs of Europe
Fossils of Hungary
Fossil taxa described in 2005
Ornithischian genera